Camuropiscis is an extinct genus of arthrodire placoderm from the Early Frasnian stage of the Late Devonian period, found at the Gogo Formation of Kimberley, Western Australia.  The species of Camuropiscis had a flattened, elongated snout that may have aided in enhancing its hydrodynamic streamlining.

Etymology
Camuropiscis translates as "flat-nosed fish."

Phylogeny
Camuropiscis is a member of the family Camuropiscidae under the superfamily Incisoscutoidea, which belongs to the clade Coccosteomorphi, one of the two major clades within Eubrachythoraci. The cladogram below shows the phylogeny of Camuropiscis:

References

Placoderm genera
Camuropiscidae